The 1961–62 season was Port Vale's 50th season of football in the English Football League, and their third season in the Third Division. The season was most notable for the win over Sunderland in the FA Cup, which followed a goalless draw at Roker Park in which the Vale defence prevented Brian Clough from even having a shot. The club also hosted a friendly against the Czechoslovakia national football team, and later took a tour of Poland. In the league they failed to gain promotion, and had to settle for mid-table obscurity.

Overview

Third Division
The pre-season saw Norman Low spend some of the £10,000 in transfer funds he was allocated. He spent £2,000 acquiring inside-forward Arthur Longbottom from Queens Park Rangers. Low then repaid West Bromwich Albion the £10,000 for Stan Steele in order to bring him back to Vale Park. This meant a 'shock' for the fans, as Cliff Portwood was sold to Grimsby Town for £6,000 to balance the books. Another £2,000 was spent on bringing centre-half John Nicholson from Liverpool. Free signings included winger Stan Edwards (Everton), goalkeeper Peter Taylor (Middlesbrough), and Joe Maloney (Shrewsbury Town). Low declared that the logic behind the signings was to improve the defence and that his side was now 'capable of getting promotion'. To whip the new signings into shape trainer Lol Hamlett took them on a seven-mile run.

The defence began poorly, in an opening day 4–2 defeat to Shrewsbury Town at Gay Meadow. Maloney was subsequently dropped and sold to Crewe Alexandra for 'a small fee'. The first match at Burslem saw Vale ' casually steamroller' Hull City 4–0. On 2 September, John Nicholson made the first of his club record 208 consecutive appearances, that would end on 8 September 1965. On a four match sequence without a win, The Sentinel commented that "gloom has descended". The mood lifted with a 1–0 win over Bristol City at Ashton Gate on 9 September, in the first of five wins in six games.

On 2 October Czechoslovakia beat Vale 3–1 in front of 22,895 fans at Vale Park, repaying the club for their successful tour of the country at the end of the 1959–60 season. Later that month Dennis Fidler was sold to Grimsby Town for £2,000, and the "Valiants" struggled. Vale then signed Colin Grainger from Leeds United for £6,000, and the former England international scored on his debut. In December, Low further added to his firepower by signing Ralph Hunt from Swindon Town for £3,500. Hunt scored a hat-trick in his second game for the club, a 4–1 win over Shrewsbury Town. He also hit the back of the net in the following two victories. Vale then struggled in the league, losing four games on the bounce. Around this time rivals Stoke City faced an upsurge in support with the return of Stanley Matthews. Low attempted to tempt Tom Finney out of retirement, but was unsuccessful.

By the end of February Vale lay just four points clear of relegation and star player Grainger was out injured. Beating Barnsley 2–0, they picked up six points out of a possible ten. They then remained unbeaten throughout the opening six games of April to ensure survival. At this time Noel Kinsey's contract was cancelled, as he wished to go into the pottery business in Norwich. At Vale Park, an £8,000 social club was opened, as the club management stated their intention to turn the ground into 'a real family social centre'.

They finished the season in twelfth position with 45 points, closer to the drop than promotion. A strong defence was not supported by a weak attack. Llewellyn and Longbottom scored twenty goals each in all competitions, but received little support.

Finances
On the financial side, declining attendances failed to prevent a profit of £1,261. This profit came thanks to a hefty £16,250 donation from the Sportsmen's Association, as well as Vale's daily pools. Gate receipts stood at £44,388, whilst expenditures rose to £73,059 despite wages being kept at around £31,000. Peter Taylor was allowed to leave for Burton Albion as he failed to dislodge Ken Hancock, Taylor later became acquainted with Brian Clough at Burton. Low also sold three players for £2,000 each: Brian Jackson to Peterborough United, Ralph Hunt to Newport County, and David Raine to Doncaster Rovers.

In May the team took a tour of Poland, playing four friendlies, climbing the Tatra Mountains, and sailing on the Tatras river. When one boat capsized, 'the lads told the attendant in colourful Potteries language what they thought of him'. The final game of the tour was a goalless draw with Legia.

Cup competitions
In the FA Cup, Vale brushed past Bradford Park Avenue with a 1–0 win at Horsfall Stadium. In the Second Round they faced Crewe Alex, who they beat 3–0 in a replay, following a 1–1 draw at Gresty Road. Vale then beat Northampton Town 3–1, all the goals coming from Bert Llewellyn. In the Fourth Round they travelled to Sunderland's Roker Park, holding the "Mackems" to a goalless draw in front of 49,468 noisy Sunderland fans - not even £50,000 star striker Brian Clough could master the Vale defence. For the return, 28,226 witnessed a 3–1 victory for the Vale over the Second Division side in 'a magical piece of soccer history'. The Vale had 'spat and hissed like angry alley cats' for their win, intimidating tricky winger Harry Hooper. In the Fifth Round they were beaten by First Division Fulham at Craven Cottage with a disputed late penalty. The referee also gave the "Cottagers" a goal kick when the ball had in fact crossed the line for a goal – to the fury of the Vale supporters.

In the League Cup, First Division Blackpool took a 2–1 win at Bloomfield Road to dump Vale out of the competition.

League table

Results
Port Vale's score comes first

Football League Third Division

Results by matchday

Matches

FA Cup

League Cup

Player statistics

Appearances

Top scorers

Transfers

Transfers in

Transfers out

References
Specific

General

Port Vale F.C. seasons
Port Vale